Chitra Lekha Yadav (Nepali: चित्र लेखा यादव), a member of Nepali Congress, assumed the post of the Minister of Education of Nepal
on 25 February 2014 under Sushil Koirala-led government.

Political career
Chitra Lekha Yadav was elected to the Pratinidhi Sabha in the 1999 election on behalf of the Nepali Congress. Yadav became its deputy chairman. Nepali Congress divided vertically to two parties, one led by former Prime Minister Sher Bahadur Deuba, Nepali Congress (Democratic), and the other is led by Girija Prasad Koirala. After vertical split of the party, she supported Nepali Congress (Democratic) (which later reunified with NC).

Yadav is the NC candidate in the Siraha-2 constituency for the 2008 Constituent Assembly election.

References

Living people
Nepali Congress politicians from Madhesh Province
Nepali Congress (Democratic) politicians
Government ministers of Nepal
Women government ministers of Nepal
1965 births
People from Siraha District
Nepal MPs 2017–2022
Nepal MPs 1999–2002
Members of the 2nd Nepalese Constituent Assembly